Imperial Noble Consort Dunhui (6 September 1856 – 18 May 1933), of the Manchu Bordered Blue Banner Sirin Gioro clan, was a consort of the Tongzhi Emperor.

Life

Family background
Imperial Noble Consort Dunhui's personal name was not recorded in history.

 Father: Luolin, served as a sixth rank literary official
 Paternal grandfather: Jiqing

Xianfeng era
The future Imperial Noble Consort Dunhui was born on the eighth day of the eighth lunar month in the sixth year of the reign of the Xianfeng Emperor, which translates to 6 September 1856 in the Gregorian calendar.

Tongzhi era
In November 1872, Lady Sirin Gioro entered the Forbidden City and was granted the title "Noble Lady Jin" by the Tongzhi Emperor. On 23 December 1874, she was elevated to "Concubine Jin".

Guangxu era
The Tongzhi Emperor died on 12 January 1875 and was succeeded by his cousin Zaitian, who was enthroned as the Guangxu Emperor. Lady Sirin Gioro was elevated on 6 February 1894 to "Consort Jin", and on 29 May 1895 to "Noble Consort Jin".

Xuantong era
The Guangxu Emperor died on 14 November 1908 and was succeeded by his nephew Puyi, who was enthroned as the Xuantong Emperor. On 18 November 1908, Lady Sirin Gioro was granted the title "Dowager Noble Consort Jin".

Republican era
After the fall of the Qing dynasty in 1912, Puyi and members of the imperial clan were allowed to retain their noble titles and continue living in the Forbidden City. On 12 March 1913, Puyi elevated Lady Sirin Gioro to "Dowager Imperial Noble Consort Ronghui". After Puyi was forced to leave the Forbidden City on 21 November 1924, Lady Sirin Gioro also followed suit.

Lady Sirin Gioro died on 18 May 1933 in the mansion of Gurun Princess Rongshou, a daughter of Prince Gong. Puyi granted her the posthumous title "Imperial Noble Consort Dunhui". On 15 March 1935, she was interred in the Hui Mausoleum of the Eastern Qing tombs.

Titles
 During the reign of the Xianfeng Emperor (r. 1850–1861):
 Lady Sirin Gioro (from 6 September 1856)
 During the reign of the Tongzhi Emperor (r. 1861–1875):
 Noble Lady Jin (from November 1872), sixth rank consort
 Concubine Jin (from 23 December 1874), fifth rank consort
 During the reign of the Guangxu Emperor (r. 1875–1908):
 Consort Jin (from 6 February 1894), fourth rank consort
 Noble Consort Jin (from 29 May 1895), third rank consort
 During the years of the Republic of China (1912–1949):
 Imperial Noble Consort Ronghui (from 12 March 1913), second rank consort
 Imperial Noble Consort Dunhui (from 1933)

See also
 Ranks of imperial consorts in China#Qing
 Royal and noble ranks of the Qing dynasty

Notes

References
 

1856 births
1933 deaths
Qing dynasty imperial consorts
Manchu people
Sirin Gioro
Consorts of the Tongzhi Emperor